John Abdo  ( – August 9, 2022) was an American health and fitness coach, businessman, nutritionist, motivational speaker and a TV personality. He was a strength and conditioning coach for numerous U.S. Olympic team athletes for the 1976, 1980, 1984, and 1988 Olympic Games. Abdo was inducted into the National Fitness Hall of Fame in 2007 for his work in the field of health and fitness. He authored several books on fitness, motivation and health.

Death 
Abdo died on August 9, 2022, at the age of 66.

References

External links

1950s births
2022 deaths
American health and wellness writers
American nutritionists
American motivational speakers
American exercise instructors
Year of birth missing